"Come Fly with Me" (explicitly "Come Fuck with Me", as the chorus says) was initially the first single from Afro-Trinidadian American female hip-hop artist Foxy Brown's canceled album Black Roses. The single was later dubbed as a promotional release due to the rapper's hearing loss and recovery. It was released on July 12, 2005.

References

2005 singles
Foxy Brown (rapper) songs
Songs written by Jay-Z
Songs written by Foxy Brown (rapper)
Roc-A-Fella Records singles
2005 songs